George Louis Wellington (January 28, 1852March 20, 1927) was a Republican member of the United States Senate, representing the State of Maryland from 1897 to 1903.  He also represented the sixth district of Maryland in the U.S. House of Representatives.

Born in Cumberland, Maryland, to a father and mother from Hesse and Bavaria, respectively, Wellington attended a German school with some private instruction.  He went on to be a clerk in the Second National Bank of Cumberland in 1870 and later was a teller.

From 1882 to 1888 and 1890, Wellington was treasurer of Allegany County, Maryland.  He unsuccessfully ran for Comptroller of Maryland in 1889, but was chosen as the assistant treasurer of the United States at Baltimore, Maryland, from 1890 to 1893.

Wellington was unsuccessful in his campaign to be elected to the 53rd Congress in 1892, but two years later, in 1894, was elected as a Republican to the 54th Congress.  After serving one term, he was elected to the United States Senate in 1896, serving one term from 1897 to 1903, choosing not to run for re-election in 1902.  As senator, he was chairman of the U.S. Senate Committee to Establish a University of the United States (55th and 56th Congresses).

On September 4, 1900, Wellington formally withdrew from the Republican Party and supported Democratic presidential candidate William Jennings Bryan (who was running against Pres. William McKinley for the second consecutive time). The September 5, 1900, edition of The New York Times described it thus:

In 1913, Wellington again sought election as senator, but as a member of the Progressive Party.  He was not elected and, following the election, he engaged in civic activities.  He became president of two banks and held an interest in the electric railways and electric companies in his hometown of Cumberland.

Wellington died in Cumberland, and is buried at Rose Hill Cemetery.

Bibliography

References

1852 births
1927 deaths
Politicians from Cumberland, Maryland
American people of German descent
Republican Party members of the United States House of Representatives from Maryland
Republican Party United States senators from Maryland
Maryland Progressives (1912)
Burials at Rose Hill Cemetery (Cumberland, Maryland)
19th-century American politicians
20th-century American politicians